L'Abergement-de-Varey is a commune in the department of Ain in eastern France.

Geography
The commune is located in the first foothills of the Bugey, not far from Pont-d'Ain. Highway 59 crosses the commune, which is situated on a hillside.

Name
There are four communes in Ain, with the name abergement, which is typical of the Jura, and also exists in Saône-et-Loire, Côte-d'Or, and Doubs; the other three are Le Petit-Abergement, Le Grand-Abergement, L'Abergement-Clémenciat. It apparently designated agricultural concessions granted from the 11th to the 15th century.

Population

Sights
Neo-roman church built in the 19th century
Monument to the Resistance

See also
Communes of the Ain department

References

External links

LesCommunes.com

Communes of Ain